Chris Dier is an American educator and author. He taught in St. Bernard Parish, Louisiana for a decade before transitioning to Benjamin Franklin High School (New Orleans). Dier was named the 2020 Louisiana Teacher of the Year and a 2020 National Teacher of the Year Finalist. Dier authored The 1868 St. Bernard Parish Massacre: Blood in the Cane Fields.

Early life and education
Dier was born on July 2, 1988, in New Orleans, Louisiana. In 2005, Dier was relocated to East Texas during his senior year of high school after Hurricane Katrina destroyed his family's home in St. Bernard Parish. After finishing his senior year, Dier attended East Texas Baptist University where he received a bachelor's degree in history.

After ETBU, Dier returned to St. Bernard Parish. Dier became a teacher, attributing inspiration to his mother, Lynne Dier, who is a teacher in St. Bernard Parish. Dier then received a Masters of Arts in Teaching and a Masters in Educational Administration from the University of New Orleans.

Career
Dier was featured in numerous publications and outlets for his work in the classroom. In 2019, Dier's class was featured in The New York Times for his lesson on Donald Trump's impeachment. Due to this lesson, Dier was a guest on the Canadian Broadcast Corporation show As It Happens.

Dier was featured in The Washington Post, Education Week, Politico, the School Library Journal, New Orleans Magazine, and The Times-Picayune. During the COVID‑19 pandemic, Dier was a guest on CNN's Global Town Hall – Coronavirus: Facts and Fears with Anderson Cooper and Sanjay Gupta regarding opening up schools.

Outside of teaching, Dier is a writer. In 2017, Dier authored The 1868 St. Bernard Parish Massacre: Blood in the Cane Fields, by the History Press. The book details one of the deadliest massacres against African-Americans in Louisiana history. The St. Bernard Parish massacre occurred during the Reconstruction era as an effort to suppress the Black vote during the 1868 United States presidential election. The book was recommended by The Times-Picayune, New Orleans Magazine, and The New Orleans Workers' Group. Dier hosts book signings and talks at coffee shops, bookstores, museums, and colleges and has been interviewed by various newspapers, radio stations, and podcasts. Dier published an article about the event in Zócalo Public Square.

On March 15, 2020, Dier published "An Open Letter to Seniors." Dier wrote the letter to let students know that they're not forgotten throughout all of this and to relate to them considering he lost his senior year due to Katrina. The letter was viewed over a million times and reached countries across the world. It was featured in outlets across the country, including in Education Week, the Washington Post, the American Heart Association News, and Chicago Tribune. Dier was featured on local news outlets WGNO News with a Twist, and WWLTV. He was also featured on NPR Weekend Edition, and The Today Show.

Dier taught for ten years in St. Bernard Parish. Currently, he teaches social studies at Benjamin Franklin High School in New Orleans.

Awards and honors
Dier was voted the St. Bernard Parish District-Wide Teacher of the Year twice, named the 2020 Louisiana State Teacher of the Year, and selected as a finalist for National Teacher of the Year. Dier was the first educator from Louisiana to be selected as a finalist since 1989. Dier was also named a 2020 Louisianian of the Year by Louisiana Life Magazine.  In 2021, Dier was awarded the H. Councill Trenholm Memorial Award by the National Education Association. That same year, he was selected as the 2021 Louisiana History Teacher of the Year by the Gilder Lehrman Institute of American History.

References

External links 
 Official website for Chris Dier

1988 births
Living people
University of New Orleans alumni
East Texas Baptist University alumni
Schoolteachers from Louisiana
21st-century American educators
People from St. Bernard Parish, Louisiana
21st-century American male writers
21st-century American historians
American male non-fiction writers